Salmon Stream is a small meltwater stream about 6 nautical miles (11 km) long, draining from the Salmon Glacier and flowing into Salmon Bay on the coast of Victoria Land. Originally named Davis Creek by the British Antarctic Expedition, 1910–13. Renamed for its association with Salmon Glacier by the New Zealand Antarctic Place-Names Committee (NZ-APC) in 1960.

Rivers of Victoria Land
Scott Coast